Heinz Rodinger (born 21 February 1941) is an Austrian sprint canoer who competed in the early 1970s. He was eliminated in the repechages of the K-4 1000 m event at the 1972 Summer Olympics in Munich. 
From 1956 to 2020 he paddled 333.333 km on various rivers and lakes in Europe, Kanada and Australia.

References

1941 births
Austrian male canoeists
Canoeists at the 1972 Summer Olympics
Living people
Olympic canoeists of Austria